Karigador is a village in the Brtonigla municipality in Istria County, Croatia.

Geography

Karigador is situated on the western coast of Istria peninsula, six kilometers north of Novigrad and eight kilometers of Umag. Area of municipality extends from Autocamp Umag in the north to Dajla in south.

References

Populated places in Istria County
Italian-speaking territorial units in Croatia